Graeme Peter Crump (1921 – 1 March 2012), known professionally as Peter Graeme and as 'Timmy' Crump to friends and family,  was an English oboist and academic teacher. He was best known as the principal oboist of the Melos Ensemble.

Career 

Peter Graeme  studied the oboe with Léon Goossens. Graeme was the oboist of the Melos Ensemble, founded in 1950, and participated with the group in the premiere of the War Requiem by Benjamin Britten, conducted by the composer at the Coventry Cathedral in 1962.

In 1954 he played English horn in a recording of Warlock's song cycle The Curlew. In 1964 he performed in a recording of Benjamin Britten's opera Albert Herring, conducted by the composer. In 1965 he recorded Bach's cantatas Herr, deine Augen sehen nach dem Glauben, BWV 102 and Süßer Trost, mein Jesus kömmt, BWV 151 with the English Chamber Orchestra (ECO) conducted by Britten and soloists Janet Baker, Peter Pears and Dietrich Fischer-Dieskau. In 1968 he took part in a recording of Bach's Brandenburg Concertos with the ECO conducted by Britten. Also with the English Chamber Orchestra and flutist Richard Adeney he recorded works of Gustav Holst, such as A Fugal concerto for Flute, Oboe and Strings, op. 40/2, conducted by the composers daughter Imogen Holst at the 1969 Aldeburgh Festival. Both in 1971 and 1972, he played in a recording of Bach's St John Passion with Peter Pears as the Evangelist, Gwynne Howell as the Vox Christi, and the ECO conducted by Britten. In 1972 he also recorded Britten's opera The Turn of the Screw. In 1982 he participated in a recording of the Octet op. 67 of Egon Wellesz with the members of the Melos Ensemble Hugh Maguire and Nicholas Ward (violin), Patrick Ireland (viola), Terence Weil (cello), William Waterhouse (bassoon), Thea King (clarinet), and Timothy Brown (horn).

Graeme was a teacher at the Royal Northern College of Music, among his students is Robin Williams.

Graeme died at home in Shaftesbury on 1 March 2012.

Recordings with the Melos Ensemble 

Graeme recorded chamber music with the Melos Ensemble, its principal players Richard Adeney and William Bennett (flute), Gervase de Peyer (clarinet), Sarah Barrington (oboe), Neill Sanders (horn), William Waterhouse (bassoon), Emanuel Hurwitz and Ivor McMahon (violin), Cecil Aronowitz (viola), Terence Weil (cello), Osian Ellis (harp) and Lamar Crowson (piano).

This included works for a large ensemble of both woodwinds and strings, for which the Melos Ensemble was founded.
 Beethoven: Wind Octet
 Schubert: Octet
 Janáček: Mládí
 Nikos Skalkottas: Octet
 Gordon Crosse: Concerto Da Camera
 Harrison Birtwistle: Tragoedia
 Peter Maxwell Davies: Leopardi Fragments
Graeme also recorded chamber music for smaller formations, such as the oboe quintet of Arthur Bliss, dedicated to Léon Goossens.
 Beethoven: Quintet for piano and winds, Rondino in E flat major, WoO 25
 Nielsen: Wind Quintet
 Francis Poulenc: Trio for Oboe, Bassoon & Piano
 Jean Françaix: Divertissement for Oboe, Clarinet & Bassoon
 Arthur Bliss: Conversations for Flute, Oboe and String Trio, Quintet for Oboe and Strings

References 

1921 births
British classical oboists
Male oboists
2012 deaths
20th-century classical musicians
20th-century British male musicians